East Palo Alto (abbreviated E.P.A.) is a city in San Mateo County, California, United States. As of the 2020 census, the population of East Palo Alto was 30,034. It is situated on the San Francisco Peninsula, roughly halfway between the cities of San Francisco and San Jose. To the north and east is the San Francisco Bay, to the west is the city of Menlo Park, and to the south the city of Palo Alto. Despite being called "East" Palo Alto, the city is directly north of Palo Alto. While often incorrectly assumed to be part of the city of Palo Alto, East Palo Alto has always been a separate entity since its founding as an unincorporated community and its incorporation in July 1983. It is also in San Mateo County, while Palo Alto is in Santa Clara County. The two cities are separated only by San Francisquito Creek and, largely, the Bayshore Freeway (the vast majority of East Palo Alto is northeast of the freeway, while all of the residential part of Palo Alto is southwest of the freeway). The revitalization projects in 2000, and high income high-tech professionals moving into new developments, including employees from Google and Facebook, have begun to eliminate the cultural and economic differences between the two cities. East Palo Alto and Palo Alto share both telephone area codes and postal ZIP codes.

In 1990, 43% of East Palo Alto's residents were African Americans, which was the result of redlining practices and racial deed restrictions in Palo Alto. As of 2020, Latinos constitute about 66% of the total population, while the proportion of African Americans has decreased to about 11%. A small minority of Pacific Islanders also reside in East Palo Alto, most of Tongan, Samoan and Fijian origin.

The prosperity that benefited the Silicon Valley during the dot-com boom of the late 1990s largely bypassed East Palo Alto. The Ravenswood City School District, which serves East Palo Alto and part of adjoining Menlo Park, has struggled with low academic performance. Eventually, however, the Peninsula's shortage of land and soaring property prices meant that even East Palo Alto became an option for urban regeneration. Until recently, gentrification has been rare in East Palo Alto.

East Palo Alto also includes a small piece of land across the Bayshore Freeway (U.S. Route 101) from the shopping center, a roughly triangular area between US 101 and San Francisquito Creek, formerly the site of a two-block-long retail business district known as Whiskey Gulch. Whiskey Gulch, which was just outside these limits, became home to a number of liquor stores, bars, and music venues. Long after the university had relaxed its prohibition rules, the neighborhood still retained this character until 2000, when the city tore down Whiskey Gulch and replaced it with the University Circle office complex. A 200-room Four Seasons hotel opened in University Circle in 2006.

Over 25% of East Palo Alto (400+ acres) has been bulldozed and replaced with brand new housing and brand-name retail establishments over the last 10–15 years (since approximately 1997), including IKEA, Target, Home Depot, Nordstrom Rack, Togo's, Starbucks, Office Depot, Mi Pueblo Food Center, PGA Tour Superstore, 6 to 9 Dental and Jamba Juice, attracting an entirely new demographic. The University Square community has become particularly appealing to young high-tech professionals and high-income couples, including many employees from Google, Facebook, Sun Microsystems, Yahoo!, and various other software and startup companies.

History

The Ohlone tribe of Native Americans inhabited this area at least by 1500 to 1000 BC. One tumulus was discovered in 1951 during development of the University Village subdivision near today's Costaño School. After a year-long excavation of 60 graves and 3,000 artifacts, researchers concluded Native Americans had utilized the area as a cemetery and camp, rather than as a permanent settlement. In later years another mound was found near Willow Road and the railroad right-of-way.

From the 1850s through the 1940s, the area which was to become East Palo Alto went through many changes. In 1849, Isaiah Churchill Woods (1825–1880) attempted to make the area around what is now Cooley Landing in the northeast of the current city a major shipping town and named the area Ravenswood. In 1868, after Woods' investments failed he sold the wharf to Lester Phillip Cooley (1837–1882), who leased the land to the brick factory Hunter and Schakleford. When the brick factory left the landing in 1884, the land around the landing was reverted to a ranch.

With the outbreak of World War I, the north side of East Palo Alto became a military training ground, of which only the Veterans Administration Hospital in Menlo Park still exists (now as part of the VA Sierra Pacific Network). In the 1940s, East Palo Alto was a farming community with many Japanese residents. During the war, the Japanese were forced out, many to relocation centers, and did not return after the war. In the 1950s the farms were built over with cheap housing and many African-American families moved in.

The current demographics of East Palo Alto are largely a result of redlining housing policies and events that occurred in the 1950s. In particular, in 1954 the then-president of the California Real Estate Association, Floyd Lowe, implemented a strategy that turned a neighborhood on the East side of Palo Alto from predominantly white to predominantly black in a very short amount of time. He did this by "blockbusting," which is a strategy that was employed all over the country to similar results. Blockbusting involves instilling panic in white neighborhoods by warning of a "Negro invasion" when a black family considers purchasing a house in an area, in order to produce white flight and an ensuing drop in property values, which can then be purchased at a heavy discount and sold or rented to African Americans for a profit. In 1954, Lowe alerted the neighborhood that a "Negro invasion" was imminent, and as intended, white flight ensued. Lowe profited due to the low prices at which the white families fleeing were willing to sell their homes, and within a few years, the demographics of the area had flipped. As white-owned businesses fled the area, it became poorer and overcrowded – a legacy that has persisted. This segregationist act was never questioned by the government, and it led to many of the demographic and socioeconomic differences that exist between Palo Alto and East Palo Alto today.

These differences in demographics and wealth perversely accelerated with the introduction of the  Community Reinvestment Act of 1977, which banned redlining. Home prices doubled by 1979, and many of the more educated and upwardly mobile African Americans took advantage of their newfound freedom to move into wealthier communities with more amenities, leaving the remaining community even poorer and with less access to home ownership than had been the case before the Act.

During the civil rights movement of the 1960s there was a renewed interest in African history, one expression of which was a fad for Swahili. In 1968 the area was almost renamed Nairobi, after the center of the Swahili-speaking area, to reflect the population's African roots. Critics of the change pointed out that Nairobi was the capital of Kenya, in East Africa, and had little to do with the cultural roots of most black Americans. In the end, the change was not made.
Historically East Palo Alto had relatively little shopping and business compared to surrounding areas, and most of it constituted an unincorporated "island" within San Mateo County, depending on county government for services and on the San Mateo County Sheriff for police protection and ineligible for many revenue benefits requiring city status. After several years of pro-incorporation campaigning by local community groups, including Barbara A. Mouton and East Palo Alto's Senior Citizen Center president Ruth I. Myers, 1982 ballot measure that was stopped by a lawsuit, and a subsequent election the next year, East Palo Alto became a city on July 1, 1983, with Barbara A. Mouton as its first Mayor. However, because of subsequent legal challenges to the last ballot measure, it was not until 1987 that the city was officially recognized as such. The legal challenges were led by former U.S. Congress member Pete McCloskey, who represented one of the real-estate brokers whose original blockbusting campaign had turned EPA into a mostly black town. The final tally was 1,777 for and 1,764 against, a margin of 13 votes and a majority of 50.2%.

Significant gentrification occurred in East Palo Alto from around the founding of Facebook, with the construction of a large shopping center named Ravenswood 101—including a Home Depot, a Best Buy, and an IKEA store—and several upscale housing communities intended for high-earning Silicon Valley workers. This development faced opposition from some residents, who charged that it priced locals out of one of the region's only affordable communities while providing only low-paying retail jobs and consuming disproportionate land area (2.2 square miles). Supporters pointed to an increased tax base.

In 2008, after twenty years without a supermarket, East Palo Alto individuals and organizations established the East Palo Alto Community Farmers' Market. In November 2009, the Mi Pueblo Food Center grocery store opened in the Ravenswood 101 shopping center in the location of the former Circuit City store. Mi Pueblo was the city's first full-service supermarket in 23 years.

Starting in 2006, a large real estate investor, Page Mill Properties, purchased almost the entire west side of East Palo Alto and contested most of the city's rent control laws in what some claimed was a 'predatory equity scheme'.  Page Mill left East Palo Alto in the fall of 2009 after defaulting on a $240-million bank loan.

Geography
East Palo Alto is located in San Mateo County. Despite its name, it lies almost entirely north, and not east of Palo Alto. It is bordered on the west by Menlo Park, to the south by Palo Alto, and to the east by the San Francisco Bay. The San Francisquito Creek defines its southern edge. To the north are Ravenswood Point and the western end of the Dumbarton Bridge in Menlo Park.

Demographics

2020 census

2010
The 2010 United States Census reported that East Palo Alto had a population of 28,155. The racial makeup of East Palo Alto was 1,754 (6.2%) White, 4,704 (16.7%) African American, 120 (0.4%) Native American, 1,057 (3.8%) Asian, 2,118 (7.5%) Pacific Islander, 10,694 (38.0%) from other races, and 1,358 (4.8%) from two or more races. Hispanic or Latino of any race were 18,147 persons (64.5%). Among the Hispanic population, 15,319 (54.4%) are Mexican, 69 (0.2%) are Puerto Rican, 23 (0.1%) are Cuban, and 2,736 (9.7%) are other Hispanic or Latino.

The Census reported that 28,001 people (99.5% of the population) lived in households, 150 (0.5%) lived in non-institutionalized group quarters, and 4 (0%) were institutionalized.

There were 6,940 households, out of which 3,767 (54.3%) had children under the age of 18 living in them, 3,144 (45.3%) were opposite-sex married couples living together, 1,510 (21.8%) had a female householder with no husband present, 625 (9.0%) had a male householder with no wife present. There were 529 (7.6%) unmarried opposite-sex partnerships, and 59 (0.9%) same-sex married couples or partnerships. 1,196 households (17.2%) were made up of individuals, and 316 (4.6%) had someone living alone who was 65 years of age or older. The average household size was 4.03. There were 5,279 families (76.1% of all households); the average family size was 4.38.

The population was spread out, with 8,976 people (31.9%) under the age of 18, 3,487 people (12.4%) aged 18 to 24, 8,897 people (31.6%) aged 25 to 44, 5,120 people (18.2%) aged 45 to 64, and 1,675 people (5.9%) who were 65 years of age or older. The median age was 28.1 years. For every 100 females, there were 102.7 males. For every 100 females age 18 and over, there were 102.5 males.

The homeowner vacancy rate was 2.1%; the rental vacancy rate was 13.3%. 12,628 people (44.9% of the population) lived in owner-occupied housing units and 15,373 people (54.6%) lived in rental housing units.

2000
As of the census of 2000, there were 35,791 people, 7,104 households, and 5,793 families residing in the city.

There were 7,104 households, of which 41.7% had children under the age of 18 living with them, 44.4% were married couples living together, 19.5% had a female householder with no husband present, and 28.5% were non-families. 22.2% of all households were made up of individuals, and 5.1% had someone living alone who was 65 years of age or older. The average household size was 6.24 and the average family size was 7.65.

In the city, the population was spread out, with 47.1% under the age of 18, 19.5% from 18 to 24, 31.2% from 25 to 44, 11.1% from 45 to 64, and 3.6% who were 65 years of age or older. The median age was 21 years. For every 100 females, there were 109.2 males. For every 100 females age 18 and over, there were 108.9 males.

The median income for a household in the city was $44,006, and the median income for a family was $42,342. Males had a median income of $25,631 versus $28,044 for females. The per capita income for the city was $13,774. About 22.2% of families and 21.0% of the population were below the poverty line, including 20.1% of those under age 18 and 14.7% of those age 65 or over.

Transportation
U.S. Route 101 cuts through the southern part of the city, with two on ramps and off ramps in the city (University and Willow). There are frontage roads on either side of the freeway. The Dumbarton Bridge in neighboring Menlo Park connects East Palo Alto to Alameda County, which lies to the east across San Francisco Bay, and carries State Route 84 into East Palo Alto toward U.S. 101.

Public transportation is provided by SamTrans.

Government
The terms of Mayor and Vice Mayor are for one year and expire at the first meeting in December.

Education

Primary and secondary schools
The Ravenswood City School District has its headquarters in East Palo Alto.

The schools in the city are Costaño School of the Arts, Belle Haven Elementary, Los Robles-Ronald McNair Academy, and Cesar Chavez Ravenswood Middle School.

The Sequoia Union High School District operates the zoned high schools in the area. Between 1958 and 1976 East Palo Alto had its own high school, Ravenswood High School. After the school was closed because of low enrollment, the building was demolished in 1995 to make room for the Gateway 101 Shopping Center. Following the closure of Ravenswood High School, East Palo Alto's high school students were bused out of the city to other schools in the region, primarily Carlmont High School in Belmont. Some have called for re-opening Ravenswood High School in a new location in East Palo Alto.

In 2014, the Sequoia Union High School District discontinued the practice of busing. Today, East Palo Alto residents are zoned to Menlo-Atherton High School in Atherton. Through the district Open Enrollment process, some residents choose to attend Carlmont, Woodside High School in Woodside, or Sequoia High School in Redwood City. Alternatively, East Palo Alto Academy (opened in 2001 as East Palo Alto High School) and East Palo Alto Phoenix Academy (opened 2006) are charter high schools in East Palo Alto. There is also a private high school, Eastside College Preparatory, which opened in 1996.

Every year, parents of incoming minority children in kindergarten through grade 2 can enter a lottery (if there are more requests than the 135 slots available) to send their children to neighboring school districts under the Tinsley Voluntary Transfer Program.

Public libraries
San Mateo County Libraries operates the East Palo Alto Library, located in the municipal building at 2415 University Avenue.

Newspapers and media 
The Ravenswood Post (1953–1981) was an African-American weekly newspaper serving East Palo Alto. Other local news publishings included the newspaper, East Palo Alto Today; former newspaper, The Peninsula Bulletin; and the magazine, El Ravenswood.

Economy

Top employers 
According to the city's 2021 Annual Comprehensive Financial Report, the city's top employers were:

The total city employment for the year ended June 30, 2021 was 14,500, and the total city employment for 2014 was 13,800.

Environment
The local area around the Dumbarton Bridge is an important ecological area, hosting many species of birds, fish and mammals. The California clapper rail is known to be present in the western bridge terminus area.

The bridge is not a significant source of noise affecting East Palo Alto; however, it does cause significant traffic backups at rush hour and the city is also affected by noise from events at the nearby Shoreline Amphitheatre in Mountain View.

The Baylands Nature Preserve borders the city of East Palo Alto. The long trail along the marshland connects Mountain View, Palo Alto, and East Palo and it is used by bike commuters every day.

Notable residents

References

External links

EPA.net East Palo Alto web portal
East Palo Alto newspaper
East Palo Alto City Council website

Incorporated cities and towns in California
Cities in San Mateo County, California
Cities in the San Francisco Bay Area
Pacific Islands American culture in California
Populated coastal places in California